Samanta Villar Fitó (born September 16, 1975, Barcelona) is a Spanish journalist.

She studied Journalism at the Autonomous University of Barcelona (postgraduate course in Actors' Direction at the Ramon Llull University) and drama with Nancy Muñón.

She started her professional career as a production assistant at TV3.

Television programmes
News broadcasting, Viladecans Televisió, 1998
Agenda cultural, Barcelona Televisió, 1999
News broadcasting in TVE Catalonia, 1999–2005
España Directo, TVE 2005-2007
News broadcasting in Canal 3/24, Televisió de Catalunya. 2007- 2008
21 días, Cuatro, 2008–2010.
Conexión Samanta, Cuatro (2010 - February 2016).
Nueve meses con Samanta Cuatro (April 2016)
Samanta Y... Cuatro (November 2017)
La vida con Samanta Cuatro (2019)
Avui sortim Cuatro (2022)
A media mañana, Radio Nacional de España (September 2022 - present)

References

External links
  Information in Cuatro Web page
 

1975 births
Living people
Journalists from Catalonia
Spanish journalists
Spanish television presenters
Spanish women television presenters
Writers from Barcelona
Autonomous University of Barcelona alumni